Cape Ludwig is a peninsula in Qikiqtaaluk Region, Nunavut, Canada. It is located on Amund Ringnes Island. Massey Sound is nearby, entered from Norwegian Bay between Cape Ludwig and Cape Southwest. Hendriksen Strait is to the southwest.

References
 Atlas of Canada

Peninsulas of Qikiqtaaluk Region
Sverdrup Islands